Children's Hospital is an Australian television series that screened on the ABC in 1997 and 1998. There was one series of 13 episodes produced. The series was set in a busy inner-city children's hospital. It followed the stories of the hospital staff, the young patients and their concerned families.

Cast
 Ian Stenlake as James 
 Jodie Dry as Charlie 
 Rachel Szalay as Kris 
 Gennie Nevinson as Pam 
 Deborah Galanos as Meredith 
 Hugh Baldwin as Dave 
 Ling-Hsueh Tang as Tina 
 Paula Arundell as Claire 
 Stuart Robinson as Nigel

See also
 List of Australian television series

External links
 

Australian drama television series
Australian Broadcasting Corporation original programming
1997 Australian television series debuts
1998 Australian television series endings